This article refers to the World War I Royal Marine formation renumbered 188th Brigade in 1916; for the World War I Territorial Force formation refer to 188th (2/1st Northumberland) Brigade; for other uses refer to 188th Brigade (disambiguation)

The 3rd (Royal Marine) was an infantry brigade of the Royal Marines. It was assigned to the 63rd (Royal Naval) Division and served on the Western Front during the First World War.

The brigade then known as the Royal Marine Brigade, was raised in August 1914, from surplus naval reserves. On 2 August 1915, the brigade was reduced from four to two battalions and transferred to the 2nd Royal Naval Brigade. The Royal Marine Brigade was then disbanded. In May 1916, the  Royal Marine Brigade was reformed. In July 1916, it was re-designated the 1st (Royal Naval) Brigade and then the 188th Brigade later the same month.

Formation
The infantry battalions did not all serve at once, but all were assigned to the brigade during the war.
8th (Anson) Battalion
1st Royal Marines 
2nd Royal Marines
6th (Howe) Battalion
2nd Battalion, Royal Irish Regiment
188th Machine Gun Company 
188th Trench Mortar Battery

References

Infantry brigades of the British Army in World War I